Julius Bodenstab (January 13, 1834June 1, 1916) was a German American immigrant, businessman, and Wisconsin pioneer.  He was a member of the Wisconsin State Assembly, representing the city of Sheboygan during the 1873 and 1874 sessions.  He was the father of Henry Bodenstab, who served four years in the Wisconsin State Senate.

Background 
Bodenstab was born January 13, 1834, in Ronnenberg in the Kingdom of Hanover. He came to the United States in 1846 with his parents; they settled briefly in Albany, New York, but in 1847 moved on to the Wisconsin Territory, settling in Hermans Grove in the Town of Herman in Sheboygan County. He received a common school and academic education, and became a farmer.

During the American Civil War, he joined up with a volunteer company from his area, known as the "Herman Tigers".  Their company was inducted into the Union Army as Company C in the 27th Wisconsin Infantry Regiment, and Bodenstab was commissioned second lieutenant of the company.  He was promoted to first lieutenant and transferred to Company I in March 1863.  The 27th Wisconsin Infantry served in the western theater of the war, and participated in the Vicksburg Campaign and operations in Arkansas and Alabama.  Bodenstab mustered out with the rest of his regiment in August 1865.

He bought the family farm from his father, who went back to his medical practice.  He married Friedericke Schuette, another German American immigrant, in 1867.  They would have a family of one girl and three boys.

Public office 
Bodenstab served as town clerk and chairman of the town board for Herman.

In 1870 he was the Republican Party nominee for Sheboygan County's 1st Assembly district.  He lost in the general election to Democrat Charles Œtling (like himself, a native Hanoverian now living in Herman) with 756 votes to 986 for Œtling.

After redistricting in 1872, Bodenstab made another run for Assembly, but as a member of the Liberal Republican faction.  During these years, the Liberal Republicans operated in a short-term coalition with the Wisconsin Democrats known as the Reform Party.  Bodenstab defeated his Republican opponent in the general election.  Bodentstab was re-elected without opposition in 1873.

He served on the committees on the militia, and on privileges & elections. He did not run for re-election in 1874, and was succeeded by Joseph Wedig, another Reform Party member (and another Hanoverian emigrant).

After the Assembly 
Around 1875, he is reported to have sold the farm and gone into the real estate business, including building the Howards Grove Cheese Factory in 1878 (now operated as a museum of early cheesemaking under the name of "The Julius Bodenstab Cheese Factory") and trading in several lots in the nearby hamlet of Franklin in the 1880s.

He eventually moved to Milwaukee. He appears to have kept in contact with family back in Germany, as he sponsored a nephew who arrived in New York Harbor in 1902. In 1904 a private bill was passed by Congress, boosting his monthly pension to $30. In November 1908, his son Henry, an attorney, was elected to a four-year term as a Republican state senator from Milwaukee County.

He died in Milwaukee on June 1, 1916, and is buried in that city's Forest Home Cemetery.

Electoral history

Wisconsin Assembly (1870)

| colspan="6" style="text-align:center;background-color: #e9e9e9;"| General Election, November 8, 1870

Wisconsin Assembly (1872, 1873)

| colspan="6" style="text-align:center;background-color: #e9e9e9;"| General Election, November 4, 1872

| colspan="6" style="text-align:center;background-color: #e9e9e9;"| General Election, November 3, 1873

References

External links 

1834 births
1916 deaths
Farmers from Wisconsin
Businesspeople from Wisconsin
Hanoverian emigrants to the United States
Members of the Wisconsin State Assembly
People from Hanover Region
People from Howards Grove, Wisconsin
People of Wisconsin in the American Civil War
Politicians from Milwaukee
American real estate brokers
Union Army officers
Wisconsin city council members
Wisconsin Liberal Republicans
Wisconsin Republicans
Burials in Wisconsin
People from Herman, Sheboygan County, Wisconsin